The Newcastle Brown "900" Open was a golf tournament on the European Tour in 1980. It was held at Northumberland Golf Club in Gosforth, Newcastle upon Tyne, England and was part of the celebrations marking Newcastle's 900th anniversary.

The tournament was won by Ireland's Des Smyth, who holed a 45-foot putt on the last green to win the £7,000 first prize. It was his first stroke play win on the European Tour.

Winners

References

External links
Coverage on the European Tour's official site

Former European Tour events
Golf tournaments in England